The 2003 Pharmassist Players' Championship was held February 8–23 at the Black Gold Centre in Leduc, Alberta. It was the final Grand Slam event of the 2002-03 World Curling Tour.

The total purse for the event was $150,000 with $50,000 going to the winning team, which would be Jeff Stoughton's Winnipeg rink. He defeated John Morris' Stayner, Ontario rink in the final.

The event format was a triple knock out followed by an 8-team playoff.

The event was televised on Rogers Sportsnet.

Teams entered
 Adrian Bakker
 Dave Boehmer
 David Bohn
 Tom Brewster
 Craig Brown
 Kerry Burtnyk
 Martin Ferland
 Glen Despins
 Dale Duguid
 Bert Gretzinger
 Brad Gushue
 Al Hackner
 Jeff Hartung
 Glenn Howard
 Jamie King
 Kevin Koe
 Bruce Korte
 Allan Lyburn
 William Lyburn
 Kevin Martin
 Greg McAulay
 Wayne Middaugh
 John Morris
 Kevin Park
 Jay Peachey
 Vic Peters
 Brent Pierce
 Andreas Schwaller
 Jeff Sharp
 Peter Steski
 Jeff Stoughton
 Pal Trulsen

Playoffs

References

External links
CurlingZone - Results

Players Championship, 2003
Leduc, Alberta
Curling competitions in Alberta
Players' Championship
2003 in Alberta